Maneater of Hydra is a Spanish–German co-production released in 1967 directed by American expatriate Mel Welles. The alternate titles include La isla de la muerte, Island of the Doomed and The Blood Suckers (U.K. title). The horror film is set on a remote island off the shore of an unidentified European country, in which the central character is a mad scientist (Cameron Mitchell) who creates hybrid trees that feed on human blood.

Plot
Synopsis from Doomed Marathon: "A group of tourists travel to an island to see its exotic botanicals. There they meet Baron von Weser (played by Cameron Mitchell), a reclusive scientist studying esoteric horticulture and experimenting with crossbreeding dangerous varieties of plants. One of the Baron’s creations is draining the blood of human beings (through a small hole in their cheek) and the tourists are dying one by one."

Critical reception
According to one reviewer, "This Spanish/German co-production...is pretty bloody for its time (especially the finale) but, unfortunately, the print used for the DVD from Shout! Factory (as part of their "Elvira Movie Macabre" series) is a terribly soft fullframe speckled mess that's full of drop-outs, emulsion scratches and jitter. It's also obvious that it's a TV print (although it appears to be uncut), as every ten minutes the film fades to black. If you've never seen this film before, it's a pretty decent mystery/horror film with some fluid camerawork, atmosphere and a few good scares."

DVD Verdict reported Maneater of Hydra is "...a badly acted and dubbed Eurohorror that gives us carnivorous trees feasting on unsuspecting tourists. Unfortunately, these tourists are so whiny and clueless that they come off as idiots, so you end up rooting for the trees."

References

External links

1967 films
1967 horror films
German monster movies
Spanish horror films
West German films
Mad scientist films
1960s monster movies
Films about trees
Films set on islands
Films scored by Antón García Abril
English-language German films
1960s German-language films
1960s Spanish-language films
1960s German films